Scrobipalpa nitentella, the common sea groundling, is a moth of the family Gelechiidae. It is found in most of Europe, North Africa (Tunisia), Turkey, Afghanistan, Kazakhstan, China (Qinghai, Xinjiang), Mongolia and Siberia (Transbaikalia).

Adults are on wing from July to August in one generation per year.

The larvae feed on Atriplex hastata, Atriplex hortensis, Atriplex littoralis, Atriplex praecox, Atriplex prostrate, Beta maritima, Chenopodium album, Halimione pedunculata, Halimione portulacoides, Salicornia europaea, Suaeda altissima and Suaeda maritima. Young larvae mine the leaves of their host plant. The mine has the form of a short, spiralled corridor. Later, they make an irregular, sometimes branching, greenish-white blotch. Full-grown larvae live freely in a silken tunnel amongst the leaves. Full-grown larvae can be found from mid-August to the end of September. The species overwinters in the pupal stage.

References

Moths described in 1902
Scrobipalpa
Moths of Europe